Pärk or Paerk is a game, somewhat similar to a game of baseball but where the aim is to gain ground like in American football, that has been played for centuries on the island of Gotland in Baltic Sea. The players hit the ball with their hands or feet. The  paerk, or serve area, is marked off with wooden laths and measures .

The ball is made of a tight ball of yarn that has been dressed in sheepskin.

Pärk is one of the disciplines at the annual Stånga Games (Stångaspelen).

See also 
Varpa

References

External links 
Brief description

Team sports
Ball games
Gotland